Fougere may refer to:

 Fougère, one of the main olfactive families of perfumes
 Fougeré, Maine-et-Loire, a former commune in France
 Fougeré, Vendée, a commune in France
 Michael Fougere (born 1956), Canadian politician
 Vernon Fougère (1943–2013), Canadian bishop
 Eugénie Fougère (1870 – unknown), French vaudeville and music hall singer
 Eugénie Fougère (demimondaine) (1861-1903), French frequenter of the demi-monde

See also

Fougères, in Brittany, France